"Amy and Amiability" is the fifth episode of the BBC sitcom Blackadder the Third, the third series of Blackadder.

Plot 
Mr. E. Blackadder is in serious debt. Baldrick suggests that he becomes a highwayman to make money to pay off his bills; however, Blackadder, having "no desire to get hung for wearing a silly hat", simply decides to ask the Prince Regent for a raise. Unfortunately, the Prince is also broke, having been tricked out of his money by his drinking buddies during games of "cards" (he was fooled into believing that the aim was to lose all of one's money). He is therefore forced to search for a rich wife and hence a sizable dowry. Unfortunately, of the 262 princesses in Europe, only two are possible matches (165 are over 80, 47 are under 10, and 39 are mad and married to a horse): Grand Duchess Sophia of Turin, who is unlikely to marry the Prince on account of the fact she has met him, and (his eventual real-world wife) Caroline of Brunswick, a woman with "the worst personality in Germany".

Amy Hardwood (played by Miranda Richardson), daughter of a powerful, yet bad-tempered, industrialist, seems the only option despite the fact that she is incredibly childish and soppy, or as Blackadder puts it; "wetter than a haddock's bathing costume". The Prince seems unlikely to succeed on his own, given his fixation on sex, so Blackadder helps out by wooing Amy for the Prince.

The flirtation and engagement seem to be going well until Blackadder discovers that Amy's father is broke, upon which he breaks off the engagement, though too late to prevent the Prince spending vast amounts of money on wedding gifts. Blackadder saddles up Baldrick and turns to the life of a highwayman. He soon discovers that Amy Hardwood is in fact herself the notorious highwayman, The Shadow. She pretends to be in love with Blackadder to steal the Prince's money and the wedding gifts, but after having the ruse revealed to him and being tied up by her to be shot, he is rescued by Baldrick and turns her in for a £10,000 reward. The Prince, now in love with Amy, is crushed to discover that she has been arrested and hanged, but is warmed by the fact that he discovered "so much money I don't know what to do with it!", having accidentally found Edmund's reward money. The episode ends with Blackadder convincing the Prince to play a game of "cards" with him.

External links
 
 

Blackadder episodes
1987 British television episodes
Television shows written by Ben Elton
Television shows written by Richard Curtis